Irmgard Möller (born 13 May 1947) is a former member of the German group the Red Army Faction (RAF). Her father was a high school teacher, and before joining the RAF, she was a student of German studies.

RAF activity

On 12 May 1972, Möller and Angela Luther walked into police headquarters in Augsburg carrying suitcases. They placed pipe bombs in empty offices on the 3rd and 4th floors and walked out again. The subsequent explosions (around 12:15) injured five policemen and caused the fourth floor ceiling to collapse.
On 24 May of the same year it is thought that Möller was one of two people who drove cars full of explosives into the United States Military Intelligence Headquarters (G-2), (HQ USAREUR), at Campbell Barracks in Heidelberg. Three soldiers were killed in the attack (Ronald Woodward, Charles Peck and Captain Clyde Bonner) and five were wounded.
Möller was set up by fellow Red Army Faction member Hans-Peter Konieczny and was arrested on 9 July 1972, being subsequently sentenced to a lengthy prison term by a Hamburg court. She was then transferred to Stammheim Prison.

Imprisonment and suicide attempt
According to prison reports, she attempted suicide by stabbing herself four times in the chest on the morning of 18 October 1977. Of the imprisoned RAF leaders, only Möller survived what is (according to the government) supposed to have been the result of a 'suicide pact' by the group. The other Red Army members Andreas Baader, Gudrun Ensslin and Jan-Carl Raspe died by gunshot or hanging. With the unsuccessful flight 181 action there were not many chances left for liberation. During the height of the German Autumn the nature of these 'suicides' was believed (and still is) by many to be suspicious given their location in a maximum security prison; Möller herself has always declared that she never attempted suicide and that there was no pre-arranged 'suicide pact' between the prisoners. She claims that the prisoners were assassinated (extrajudicial killing) in response to the militants' demands that the prisoners be released (see German Autumn).

Möller was released from prison on 1 December 1994. Today she lives in anonymity.

See also
Members of the Red Army Faction
Red Army Faction

References

People from Bielefeld
People convicted on terrorism charges
Members of the Red Army Faction
1947 births
Living people
Bombers (people)
German female murderers